Christina Roslyng Christiansen (born 10 July 1978) is a former Danish team handball player. She is an Olympic champion and European champion. She received a gold medal with the Danish national team at the 2000 Summer Olympics in Sydney and the 2002 European Championship.

She is married to handballer Lars Christiansen. Together, they have two sons, Frederik and August. They split up in 2009, however, as of 2012, they are back together.

In 2006, she won the Danish version of Dancing With the Stars, Vild med dans, with the partner Steen Lund.

References

1978 births
Living people
Danish female handball players
Olympic gold medalists for Denmark
Handball players at the 2000 Summer Olympics
Viborg HK players
KIF Kolding players
Olympic medalists in handball
Medalists at the 2000 Summer Olympics